In probability theory and statistics, covariance is a measure of the joint variability of two random variables. If the greater values of one variable mainly correspond with the greater values of the other variable, and the same holds for the lesser values (that is, the variables tend to show similar behavior), the covariance is positive. In the opposite case, when the greater values of one variable mainly correspond to the fewer values of the other, (that is, the variables tend to show opposite behavior), the covariance is negative. The sign of the covariance, therefore, shows the tendency in the linear relationship between the variables. The magnitude of the covariance is the geometric mean of the variances that are in-common for the two random variables. The correlation coefficient normalizes the covariance by dividing by the geometric mean of the total variances for the two random variables.

A distinction must be made between (1) the covariance of two random variables, which is a population parameter that can be seen as a property of the joint probability distribution, and (2) the sample covariance, which in addition to serving as a descriptor of the sample, also serves as an estimated value of the population parameter.

Definition 

By using the linearity property of expectations, this can be simplified to the expected value of their product minus the product of their expected values:

but this equation is susceptible to catastrophic cancellation (see the section on numerical computation below).

By contrast, correlation coefficients, which depend on the covariance, are a dimensionless measure of linear dependence. (In fact, correlation coefficients can simply be understood as a normalized version of covariance.)

Definition for complex random variables

The covariance between two complex random variables  is defined as

Notice the complex conjugation of the second factor in the definition.

A related pseudo-covariance can also be defined.

Discrete random variables

It can also be equivalently expressed, without directly referring to the means, as

Examples
Consider 3 independent random variables  and two constants .

Suppose that  and  have the following joint probability mass function, in which the six central cells give the discrete joint probabilities  of the six hypothetical realizations :

 can take on three values (5, 6 and 7) while  can take on two (8 and 9). Then,

Properties

Covariance with itself
The variance is a special case of the covariance in which the two variables are identical (that is, in which one variable always takes the same value as the other):

Covariance of linear combinations
 

For a sequence  of random variables in real-valued, and constants , we have

Hoeffding's covariance identity
A useful identity to compute the covariance between two random variables   is the Hoeffding's covariance identity:

Uncorrelatedness and independence

Random variables whose covariance is zero are called uncorrelated. Similarly, the components of random vectors whose covariance matrix is zero in every entry outside the main diagonal are also called uncorrelated.

This follows because under independence,

 

The converse, however, is not generally true.
 

This example shows that if two random variables are uncorrelated, that does not in general imply that they are independent. However, if two variables are jointly normally distributed (but not if they are merely individually normally distributed), uncorrelatedness does imply independence.

Relationship to inner products 
Many of the properties of covariance can be extracted elegantly by observing that it satisfies similar properties to those of an inner product:
 symmetric: 
 positive semi-definite:  for all random variables , and  implies that  is constant almost surely.

In fact these properties imply that the covariance defines an inner product over the quotient vector space obtained by taking the subspace of random variables with finite second moment and identifying any two that differ by a constant. (This identification turns the positive semi-definiteness above into positive definiteness.) That quotient vector space is isomorphic to the subspace of random variables with finite second moment and mean zero; on that subspace, the covariance is exactly the L2 inner product of real-valued functions on the sample space.

As a result, for random variables with finite variance, the inequality

 

holds via the Cauchy–Schwarz inequality.

Proof: If , then it holds trivially. Otherwise, let random variable

 

Then we have

Calculating the sample covariance 

The sample covariances among  variables based on  observations of each, drawn from an otherwise unobserved population, are given by the  matrix  with the entries

which is an estimate of the covariance between variable  and variable .

The sample mean and the sample covariance matrix are unbiased estimates of the mean and the covariance matrix of the random vector , a vector whose jth element  is one of the random variables. If the population mean  is known, the analogous unbiased estimate is given by

 .

Generalizations

Auto-covariance matrix of real random vectors 

The covariance matrix of the matrix-vector product  is:

This is a direct result of the linearity of expectation and is useful
when applying a linear transformation, such as a whitening transformation, to a vector.

Cross-covariance matrix of real random vectors 

where  is the transpose of the vector (or matrix) .

Cross-covariance sesquilinear form of random vectors in a real or complex Hilbert space
(anti linear in the first variable) given by

Numerical computation 

Numerically stable algorithms should be preferred in this case.

Comments 
The covariance is sometimes called a measure of "linear dependence" between the two random variables. That does not mean the same thing as in the context of linear algebra (see linear dependence). When the covariance is normalized, one obtains the Pearson correlation coefficient, which gives the goodness of the fit for the best possible linear function describing the relation between the variables. In this sense covariance is a linear gauge of dependence.

Applications

In genetics and molecular biology 
Covariance is an important measure in biology. Certain sequences of DNA are conserved more than others among species, and thus to study secondary and tertiary structures of proteins, or of RNA structures, sequences are compared in closely related species. If sequence changes are found or no changes at all are found in noncoding RNA (such as microRNA), sequences are found to be necessary for common structural motifs, such as an RNA loop. In genetics, covariance serves a basis for computation of Genetic Relationship Matrix (GRM) (aka kinship matrix), enabling inference on population structure from sample with no known close relatives as well as inference on estimation of heritability of complex traits.

In the theory of evolution and natural selection, the Price equation describes how a genetic trait changes in frequency over time. The equation uses a covariance between a trait and fitness, to give a mathematical description of evolution and natural selection. It provides a way to understand the effects that gene transmission and natural selection have on the proportion of genes within each new generation of a population.  The Price equation was derived by George R. Price, to re-derive W.D. Hamilton's work on kin selection. Examples of the Price equation have been constructed for various evolutionary cases.

In financial economics

Covariances play a key role in financial economics, especially in modern portfolio theory and in the capital asset pricing model. Covariances among various assets' returns are used to determine, under certain assumptions, the relative amounts of different assets that investors should (in a normative analysis) or are predicted to (in a positive analysis) choose to hold in a context of diversification.

In meteorological and oceanographic data assimilation
The covariance matrix is important in estimating the initial conditions required for running weather forecast models, a procedure known as data assimilation. The 'forecast error covariance matrix' is typically constructed between perturbations around a mean state (either a climatological or ensemble mean). The 'observation error covariance matrix' is constructed to represent the magnitude of combined observational errors (on the diagonal) and the correlated errors between measurements (off the diagonal).  This is an example of its widespread application to Kalman filtering and more general state estimation for time-varying systems.

In micrometeorology 
The eddy covariance technique is a key atmospherics measurement technique where the covariance between instantaneous deviation in vertical wind speed from the mean value and instantaneous deviation in gas concentration is the basis for calculating the vertical turbulent fluxes.

In signal processing
The covariance matrix is used to capture the spectral variability of a signal.

In statistics and image processing 
The covariance matrix is used in principal component analysis to reduce feature dimensionality in data preprocessing.

See also 

 Algorithms for calculating covariance
 Analysis of covariance
 Autocovariance
 Covariance function
 Covariance matrix
 Covariance operator
 Distance covariance, or Brownian covariance.
 Law of total covariance
 Propagation of uncertainty

References

Covariance and correlation
Algebra of random variables